The German intervention against the Islamic State (codenamed Operation Counter Daesh) was authorized on 4 December 2015. The involvement of the country in the Syrian Civil War and the War in Iraq (2013–2017) began with the Bundeswehr mission in Syria and Iraq to combat the terrorist organization Islamic State. The mission was primarily created as a reaction to the November 2015 Paris attacks.

History
The deployment of the Bundeswehr had been discussed from the end of November 2015 within the German government, debated in parliament and decided on 4 December 2015 with a majority of the votes of the coalition parties CDU and SPD. As a justification it was stated that the terrorist attacks in Tunisia, Turkey, Beirut, against Russia and especially in Paris had shown that the terrorist organization acted far beyond their then controlled territories in Syria and Iraq, threatening European congeniality and security. Furthermore, with the attacks in Paris ISIL had attacked France and the liberal value system of Europe directly. Legally, the right to collective self-defence according to article 51 of the United Nations Charter was cited as a justification. In addition, the mission was designed to protect the people in the region from further systematic war crimes.

The Bundeswehr assists French forces with six Panavia Tornado reconnaissance aircraft (reduced to 4 in October 2017) and an A310 MRTT deployed to Incirlik Air Base in Turkey, and with a frigate (until November 2017). Armed attacks (such as launching air strikes alongside the international anti-ISIL coalition) were not conducted by Germany. The contingent of 1,200 soldiers is the currently largest foreign deployment of the Bundeswehr. Because of the risks associated with the complex situation in the ongoing Syrian Civil War, the policy of the Federal Government with the Bundeswehr mission is controversial. Critics such as Jakob Augstein, leftist columnist of German news magazine Der Spiegel, dubbed the mission "Merkel's War", which made Germany a "war party". In addition, the critics feared that the risk of terrorist attacks in Germany was likely to rise.

The parliamentary mandate for the mission was valid until 31 December 2016. It was extended on 10 November 2016 by another year until 31 December 2017. The military operation was reported to cost 134 million Euro.

After disputes with the Turkish government on planned visits by members of the German parliament to Incirlik Air Base, in June the German government decided to halt their operations from there and relocate the 250 German troops, six Tornados and the A310 MRTT tanker aircraft to Muwaffaq Salti Air Base in Jordan. The tanker arrived in Jordan on 9 July 2017, while all six Tornados were temporarily flown back to Germany. Four of them flew to Jordan and arrived on 4 October 2017. Germany reduced the Tornado fleet from six aircraft to four, citing ISIL's strength being reduced by that point in time.

While speaking at the inauguration of the Berlin headquarters of Germany's foreign intelligence agency BND on 8 February 2019, Chancellor Angela Merkel stated that despite ISIL losing most of its territory in recent years, the terror organization still remained "a threat" in Syria. ISIL "is transforming into an asymmetrical warfare force. And this, of course, is a threat," she said. Merkel listed monitoring the situation in Syria as main priority for the BND. "We remain a long way from peace in Syria," she added.

The German government ended its participation in military operations in Syria in January 2022 and extended its mission in Iraq for another nine months.

Scale of operations
There are around 1,200 personnel involved in the mission:
 air refueling (about 150)
 education (400 to 500)
 naval (about 300)
 support staff (about 50)

On 10 December 2015, 40 personnel (in an Airbus A400M Atlas) and two Panavia Tornados flew to Incirlik Air Base as the initial contingent.

The Tornados are used in an reconnaissance role.

The Bremen-class frigate F213 Augsburg joined the naval task force of French aircraft carrier  from December 2015 to March 2016 and August to November 2016.

Assets

German Air Force

 Muwaffaq Salti Air Base
 Airbus A310-304 MRTT
 Special Air Mission Wing of the Federal Ministry of Defence (German Air Force).
 Panavia Tornado IDS/ECR
 Tactical Air Force Wing 51 "Immelmann"
 Tactical Air Force Wing 33

German Navy
The Bremen-class frigate Augsburg joined the naval task force of French aircraft carrier  from December 2015 to March 2016 and August to November 2016.

See also
 International military intervention against ISIL
 Operation Inherent Resolve – American operation against ISIL
 Operation Okra – Australian operation against ISIL
 Operation Shader – British operation against ISIL
 Operation Impact – Canadian operation against ISIL
 Opération Chammal – French operation against ISIL
 Russian military intervention in the Syrian Civil War

Notes

References

 
Military operations of the Syrian civil war
Military operations of the War in Iraq (2013–2017)
Foreign relations of Germany
 
 
2015 in Germany
2016 in Germany